GMA3: What You Need to Know (often shortened to simply GMA3) is an American daytime news program broadcast by ABC. Anchored by Jennifer Ashton, DeMarco Morgan and Rhiannon Ally. It is an afternoon spin-off of ABC's national morning show Good Morning America.

The series originally premiered on September 10, 2018, as GMA Day. Hosted by Michael Strahan and Sara Haines, it replaced The Chew (which had in turn, replaced ABC's soap opera All My Children) on ABC's daytime lineup. In late January 2019, the program was rebranded as GMA3: Strahan & Sara (or simply Strahan & Sara) to place a larger emphasis on its hosts. After filling in for Haines while she was on maternity leave, actress Keke Palmer joined the program full-time in August 2019, and it was renamed accordingly to Strahan, Sara & Keke.

On March 17, 2020, Strahan, Sara & Keke was suspended due to the onset of the COVID-19 pandemic in the United States, with ABC replacing it with Pandemic: What You Need to Know—a newscast produced by ABC News Live to cover topics relating to the pandemic. Although billed as a temporary replacement for Strahan, Sara & Keke, the What You Need to Know format would eventually become permanent, with the Pandemic branding replaced by GMA3  in June, and Holmes added as a co-anchor in September.

History

Precursor 
Following the cancellation of ABC's short-lived daytime talk show The Revolution (a canceled replacement of One Life to Live), ABC aired an afternoon spin-off of Good Morning America titled Good Afternoon America as an interim replacement from July to September 2012. Hosted by Josh Elliott and Lara Spencer, the program filled the 2:00 p.m. ET/PT timeslot until September 10, 2012, when General Hospital was moved up into the timeslot, and ABC gave the 3:00 p.m. hour back to its affiliates. ABC promoted the limited-run series as primarily focusing on celebrity and pop culture topics. It departed from that format once to provide live coverage of the aftermath of the Aurora theater shooting.

Premiere 

On May 23, 2018, ABC announced that it had canceled The Chew, and that the program would be replaced by a new third hour of Good Morning America. In July 2018, the title of the program was announced as GMA Day, co-hosted by GMA anchor Michael Strahan and The View panelist Sara Haines.

On January 28, 2019, the show was rebranded as GMA3: Strahan & Sara (or simply Strahan & Sara), with a new logo and updated studio. Variety reported that the decision was meant to partially downplay its ties to Good Morning America by placing a larger emphasis on its hosts, in a similar manner to Today with Hoda & Jenna. The show's initial ratings in the first half of the season had been slightly weaker than those of The Chew, declining from a 2 million viewer average to between 1.7 and 1.9 million viewers.

With Haines going on a maternity leave after the birth of her third child in June 2019, actress Keke Palmer began filling in as a co-host in the same month. On July 31, 2019, it was reported that Palmer would join the show full-time as a third host, as the network said viewers had found Palmer to be an appealing co-host with good chemistry with Strahan and Haines. On August 26, 2019, the program was rebranded accordingly as Strahan, Sara & Keke.

What You Need to Know (March 2020–present) 

On March 11, 2020, ABC announced that the series along with its morning counterpart would suspend in-studio audiences "for the time being" due to the COVID-19 pandemic in the United States, following a similar decision made by the network and Disney–ABC Domestic Television for their other talk shows, including The View, Live with Kelly and Ryan, and Tamron Hall. 

On March 17, 2020, ABC announced that it would temporarily replace Strahan, Sara & Keke with Pandemic: What You Need to Know, a daytime newscast produced by ABC News' streaming channel ABC News Live, which would "address the widespread issues caused by the global pandemic and offer solutions from those adjusting to a new way of life." It would be anchored by Amy Robach, and feature contributions from ABC News' chief medical correspondent Jennifer Ashton.

Despite being billed as a temporary replacement for Strahan, Sara & Keke, the program slowly began to evolve into a general daytime newscast in the months that followed. By June, the program had been retitled GMA3: What You Need to Know, and began to increase its coverage of stories unrelated to COVID-19. On July 2, multiple sources confirmed to the New York Posts Page Six that the What You Need to Know format would remain permanent for the hour going forward. This included the hiring of the hour's temporary executive producer, Catherine McKenzie, into a full-time position. 

On August 2, 2020, still absent official confirmation from ABC, Palmer stated on Watch What Happens Live with Andy Cohen that Strahan, Sara & Keke had been canceled. Later that month, Variety reported that Haines would return to The View as a panelist for its upcoming season. On September 18, 2020, GMA correspondent T. J. Holmes was announced as a new co-anchor beginning on September 21, 2020. At that time, the program also received a new logo and graphics package based upon that Good Morning America, replacing the red-themed branding used since the premiere as Pandemic. 

On December 5, 2022, Holmes and Robach were temporarily placed on leave from the program by ABC News, after it was reported that the co-anchors had been in a romantic relationship. Rhiannon Ally and DeMarco Morgan began to serve as fill-ins at this time.

On January 27, 2023, it was announced that Robach and Holmes would depart the program after an investigation into their alleged affair. No official replacements have been named for the two.

See also 

 NBC News Daily

References 

2018 American television series debuts
2010s American television talk shows
2020s American television talk shows
ABC News
American Broadcasting Company original programming
English-language television shows
Television productions suspended due to the COVID-19 pandemic
Television shows filmed in New York City